HM Prison Foston Hall is a women's closed category prison and Young Offenders Institution, located in the village of Foston in Derbyshire, England. The prison is operated by His Majesty's Prison Service.

History
The original Manor of Foston and Scropton was held by the Agard family from the 14th to the 17th century. It was bought by John Bate in 1679. Richard Bate was High Sheriff of Derbyshire in 1705. Brownlow Bate sold the estate to John Broadhurst in 1784. The 17th century manor house was destroyed by fire in 1836, but many parts of that house survive.

A new Jacobethan house was designed by T. C. Hine of Nottingham and built in 1863. Its main two storey front has eight bays and an off-centre three-storey tower. The house is now a Grade II listed building.

HM Prison Service acquired the hall and grounds in 1953. During its Prison Service history Foston Hall has been a detention centre, an immigration centre, and finally before its closure during 1996 a satellite of Sudbury Prison. It was re-opened on 31 July 1997, following major refurbishment and building work, as a closed-category female prison.

The prison today
Foston Hall Prison is spread over 5 wings; C, D, E, F, T and the First Night Centre. (A & B were recently demolished). During the COVID-19 pandemic, a wing of temporary accommodation (designated G Wing) was constructed to isolate prisoners whose roles were vital to the running of the prison (Kitchens, Laundry etc) in case of a severe outbreak. The prison can accommodate both remand and convicted. Foston Hall also has a Health Care Centre.

The prison provides inmates with work in the prison gardens, the gym, the textile and craft workshop and the kitchens, all of which can lead to qualifications. In addition the prison's education department offers NVQs in Cleaning Services and hairdressing, as well as basic and key skills learning.

Notable inmates

Current
 Georgina Henshaw – waitress who stabbed her restaurant's chef to death after boasting of her intentions to friends, sentenced to 16 years imprisonment in 2018. 
 Lauren Jeska – transgender fell runner from Lancaster convicted of the attempted murder of Ralph Knibbs.
 Jessica Lynas – contributed to the murder of Gemma Hayter in 2010, which was the subject of the BBC Three documentary Gemma: My Murder
 Louise Porton – Woman who murdered her two children in 2018.
 Lorraine Thorpe – Britain's youngest female double murderer at the age of 15. One of those she killed was her own father. She will be eligible for parole in 2023.
 Zara Phythian – Dr Strange actress. She was jailed for eight years for sexually abusing a 13-year-old girl.

Former
 Maxine Carr – Sentenced to three and a half years' prison for lying about her knowledge of the Soham murders.
 Karen Matthews – Kidnapper.
 Melanie Shaw – Arsonist. Subject to several conspiracy theories linked to her whistle blowing of Beechwood Children's Home abuse.

See also
Listed buildings in Foston and Scropton

References

External links
 Ministry of Justice pages on Foston Hall
 HMP Foston Hall - HM Inspectorate of Prisons Reports
 English Heritage: architectural description of listed building
 Magna Britannia: volume 5 - Scropton Derbyshire (1817). From British History Online

Grade II listed buildings in Derbyshire
Foston Hall
Foston Hall
Foston Hall
Foston Hall
1997 establishments in England
Thomas Chambers Hine buildings